Colin Robertson, known as Millennial Woes or simply Woes, is a Scottish former YouTuber, white supremacist, and antisemitic conspiracy theorist.

According to anti-racism and anti-fascism research group Hope Not Hate, Robertson is known for supporting slavery, and has called for the bombing of refugees crossing the Mediterranean.

Robertson stepped away from political activism after various accusations of sexual harassment and assault were levelled against him. Other leaders in the far-right movement, such as Mark Collett and Jason Köhne, have stated that compelling evidence corroborates the allegations. In response to the controversy, Robertson released a statement stating that "A few of [the allegations] are true, [but] many are not", apologized for "letting people down," and stated that he intended to "take some time away to actively work on my personal failings."

Career
Robertson attended an art college in London in the mid-2000s. He launched his YouTube channel at the end of 2013.

In January 2017, Robertson began receiving coverage from BBC News and national newspapers, after Scottish tabloid the Daily Record claimed to have doxxed Millennial Woes, "expos[ing]" his birth name, family's home address and sending reporters and photographers to his parents' home to try to find him. Robertson was reported to have "left Britain", posting a video to his YouTube channel named "Fugitive Woes". BNP-affiliated group Civil Liberty publicly defended him, claiming his outing by media was a "hate campaign fomented by Daily Mirror".

In August 2017, Salon claimed that Millennial Woes was one of only a few alt-right platforms to rapidly grow, alongside Red Ice, VDARE and The Rebel Media.

On 10 December 2017, he began an interview series named Millenniyule 2017, inviting various internet personalities from the alt-right movement, including an appearance from Faith Goldy.

Speeches 
Robertson delivered a speech at the National Policy Institute Conference in November 2016, in Washington DC. On 4 February 2017, Robertson gave a speech entitled "Withnail and I as Viewed From the Right" at The London Forum in Kensington, which The Independent described as "a meeting of prominent far-right voices".  On 25 February 2017, Robertson gave a speech in Stockholm organised by Motpol, which had been promoted as "the most important alt-right conference in Europe". According to IBTimes, the event took place in a "secret location" in Södermalm. On 1 July 2017, he appeared at the Scandza Forum in Oslo, a far-right conference known for promoting racism and antisemitism. Searchlight covered his appearance, reporting the title of the conference as "Globalism v the Ethnostate" and Robertson as a "scheduled speaker".

Accusations
In May 2020, Robertson stepped away from political activism after various accusations of sexual harassment and assault were levelled against him by far-right communities online. Other leaders in the far-right movement, such as Mark Collett and Jason Köhne, have stated that compelling evidence corroborates the allegations.

Views
Robertson is a proponent of the white genocide conspiracy theory. He has claimed in interviews that "there are problems with the Jewish people".

References

External links

1983 births
Living people
Alt-right activists
Antisemitism in Scotland
British conspiracy theorists
Critics of multiculturalism
British critics of Islam
Far-right politics in Scotland
Male critics of feminism
Conservatism in the United Kingdom
Scottish bloggers
Scottish YouTubers
Scottish white nationalists
British white supremacists
Anti-Islam sentiment in the United Kingdom
Proslavery activists
YouTube controversies